Broad(s) or The Broad(s) may refer to:

People 

 A slang term for a woman.
 Broad (surname), a surname

Places 

 Broad Peak, on the border between Pakistan and China, the 12th highest mountain on Earth
 The Broads, a network of mostly navigable rivers and lakes in the English counties of Norfolk and Suffolk, United Kingdom 
The Broads include several areas of navigable water known as Broads; the largest is Hickling Broad (see :Category:Norfolk Broads) 
 The Broads (New Hampshire), a wide portion of Lake Winnipesaukee in Belknap County, New Hampshire, United States
 Broad Bay (disambiguation)
 Broad Canal, East Cambridge, Massachusetts, United States
 Broad Channel, a neighborhood in Queens, United States
 Broad Crag, a fell in the English Lake District, United Kingdom
 Broad Creek (disambiguation)
 Broad River (disambiguation)
 Broad Run (disambiguation)
 Broad Sound (disambiguation)
 Broad Valley, Graham Land, Antarctica
 Broad Water, a salt water lagoon near Tywyn, Wales, United Kingdom
 Tixall Wide, also known as The Broad Water, a body of water in Staffordshire, England, United Kingdom

Other uses 

 Broad Avenue, a street and arts district in Memphis, Tennessee
 Broad Street (disambiguation)
 Broad Group, a manufacturing company based in Changsha
 Broad (British coin), an English gold coin minted under the Commonwealth
 Broad Institute, a genomic research institute
 an 18th-century slang term for a playing card
 The Broad, a modern art museum in Los Angeles, California
 The Broad (folk custom), a hooded-animal tradition in the Cotswolds, England

See also
 Broad gauge, rail gauge greater than the standard gauge of 4′ 8½″
 Broad church, Latitudinarian churchmanship in the Church of England
 Broad Front (disambiguation)
 Broad Wall (Jerusalem), an ancient defensive wall
 Broad Dyke, built by the Dutch in 1655 in New Castle, Delaware